Rolepa innotabilis is a moth in the family Phiditiidae. It was described by Francis Walker in 1865.

References

Bombycoidea
Moths described in 1865